Peter Field may refer to:

 Pen name of Davis Dresser (1904–1977), American mystery and western writer
 Pen name of W. Ryerson Johnson (1901–1995), American pulp fiction writer and editor
 Pen name of Laura Z. Hobson (1900–1986) and Thayer Hobson
 Peter Field, Portland-based songwriter for Henry Wolfe Gummer
 Peter Field, vocalist and guitarist in Peter118, a British Christian punk band
 Peter Field, councillor for the City of Tea Tree Gully, South Australia
 Peter Field, founder of Risk (magazine)
 Peter Field, third husband of Trisha Noble, Australian singer and actress
 Peter Field, writer for the television show $40 a Day
 Peterfield, home of John Fell (judge)

See also
 Port Hope (Peter's Field) Aerodrome, Ontario, Canada
 St Peter's Square, Manchester, formerly known as St. Peter's Field and the site of the 1819 Peterloo Massacre
 Petrovo polje (Bosnia) (Peter's Field in English)